The second version of the San Diego Sockers were a team in the new Major Indoor Soccer League. The team began play in the World Indoor Soccer League in 2001, and joined the MISL when it merged with the WISL for the 2002–2003 season. Just before the beginning of the 2004–2005 season, the Sockers were sold to Raj Kalra, owner of the Vancouver Ravens of the National Lacrosse League. However, barely two months after the purchase, it was revealed that Kalra had not paid the Sockers' players, staff, or rent since taking over, and the league voted to discontinue the franchise on December 30, 2004.

Also, Dallas Sidekicks were the only team in indoor soccer history to defeat the San Diego Sockers in a championships series at the San Diego Sports Arena which happened in 2001.  A new team using the Sockers' name and logo joined the PASL-PRO in the 2009–10 season.

Honors

Championships
 none

Division Titles
 2001 WISL regular Season title

Year-by-year

Head coaches
 Brian Quinn 2001–2004

Arenas
 San Diego Sports Arena 2001–2004

 
Defunct indoor soccer clubs in the United States
Major Indoor Soccer League (2001–2008) teams
World Indoor Soccer League teams
2001 establishments in California
2004 disestablishments in California
Soccer clubs in California
Association football clubs established in 2001
Association football clubs disestablished in 2004